The 2009-10 season saw Glasgow Warriors compete in the competitions: the Magners Celtic League and the European Champions Cup, the Heineken Cup.

Season Overview

Team

Coaches

Squad

Academy players

  Chris Fusaro - Flanker
  Alex Dunbar - Centre

Back-up players

  Paul Burke (Ayr) - Flanker

Player statistics

During the 2009–10 season, Glasgow have used 37 different players in competitive games. The table below shows the number of appearances and points scored by each player.

Staff movements

Coaches

Personnel In

  Stuart Yule - Head Strength and Conditioning Coach

Personnel Out

Player movements

Academy promotions

  Peter Horne
  Pat MacArthur

Player transfers

In

Out

 Steve Swindall to  Rotherham Titans
 Eric Milligan to  Glasgow Hawks

Competitions

Pre-season and friendlies

Match 1

Stade Rochelais: Replacements:

Glasgow Warriors: Bernardo Stortoni; Chris Kinloch, Dave McCall, Rob Dewey, Hefin O"Hare; Dan Parks CAPTAIN, Colin Gregor; Kevin Tkachuk, Pat MacArthur, Hamish Mitchell, Tim Barker, Dan Turner, Calum Forrester, Paul Burke (Ayr), Richie VernonReplacements: Jon Welsh, Justin Va"a, Richie Gray, Chris Fusaro (Heriot's), Mark McMillan, Ruaridh Jackson, Peter Horne, Peter Murchie, Colin Shaw

Match 2

Clermont: Anthony Floch ; Aur_lien Rougerie CAPTAIN, Wesley Fofana, Gonzalo Canale, Napolioni Nalaga, Brock James, Morgan Parra, Davit Zirakashvili, Beno_t Cabello, Vincent Debaty, Jamie Cudmore, Thibaut Privat, Jason White, Alexandre Audebert, Elvis VermeulenReplacements: Willie Wepener, Martin Scelzo, Thomas Domingo, Lionel Faure, Julien Pierre, Christophe Samson, Julien Bardy, Kevin Senio, Ludovic Radosavljevic, Brent Russel, J_r_mie Malzieu

Glasgow Warriors: Bernardo Stortoni; Rob Dewey, Peter Murchie, Peter Horne, Colin Shaw; Ruaridh Jackson, Mark McMillan; Justin Va"a, Dougie Hall, Hamish Mitchell, Richie Gray, Dan Turner, Calum Forrester, Chris Fusaro (Heriot's)*, Johnnie BeattieReplacements (all used): Pat MacArthur, Kevin Tkachuk, Jon Welsh, Tim Barker, Richie Vernon, Paul Burke (Ayr), Colin Gregor, Dan Parks, Dave McCall, Hefin O"Hare, Chris Kinloch

Match 3

Doncaster Knights: Replacements:

Glasgow Warriors: Bernardo Stortoni; Rob Dewey, Peter Murchie, Peter Horne, Colin Shaw; Dan Parks, Mark McMillan; Justin Va"a, Pat MacArthur, Hamish Mitchell, Tim Barker, Dan Turner, Calum Forrester, John Barclay, Johnnie BeattieReplacements: Ed Kalman, Kevin Tkachuk, Jon Welsh, Dougie Hall, Alastair Kellock, Kelly Brown, Richie Vernon, Chris Cusiter, Colin Gregor, Ruaridh Jackson, Dave McCall, Graeme Morrison, Thom Evans, Hefin O"Hare, Chris Kinloch

Match 4

Glasgow Warriors: Bernardo Stortoni; Rob Dewey, Peter Murchie, Graeme Morrison, Thom Evans; Ruaridh Jackson, Mark McMillan; Jon Welsh, Dougie Hall, Moray Low, Tim Barker, Alastair Kellock CAPTAIN, Kelly Brown, John Barclay, Richie VernonReplacements (all used): Pat MacArthur, Ed Kalman, Hamish Mitchell, Kevin Tkachuk, Dan Turner, Calum Forrester, Johnnie Beattie, Chris Cusiter, Dan Parks, Peter Horne, Colin Shaw, Hefin O'Hare

Wasps: Mark Van Gisbergen; Tom Varndell, Dominic Waldouck, Ben Jacobs, David Lemi; Danny Cipriani, Joe Simpson; Tim Payne, Rob Webber, Gabriel Bocca, Marty Veale, Richard Birkett, John Hart, Serge Betsen CAPTAIN, Dan Ward-SmithReplacements: Tom Lindsay, Ben Broster, Dan Leo, Harry Ellis, Warren Fury, Dave Walder, Lachlan Mitchell, Tom French, Will Matthews, Christian Wade, Arthur Ellis

European Champions Cup

Pool 2

Results

Round 1

Round 2

Round 3

Round 4

Round 5

Round 6

Magners Celtic League

League Table

Results

Round 1

Round 2

Round 3

Round 4

Round 5

Round 6

Round 7

Round 8

Round 9: 1872 Cup (1st Leg)

Round 10: 1872 Cup (2nd Leg)

Glasgow Warriors won the 1872 Cup with an aggregate score of 47 - 27.

Round 11

Round 12

Round 13

Round 14

Round 15

Round 16

Round 17

Round 18

Play-offs

Semi-finals

End of Season awards

Competitive debuts this season

A player's nationality shown is taken from the nationality at the highest honour for the national side obtained; or if never capped internationally their place of birth. Senior caps take precedence over junior caps or place of birth; junior caps take precedence over place of birth. A player's nationality at debut may be different from the nationality shown. Combination sides like the British and Irish Lions or Pacific Islanders are not national sides, or nationalities.

Players in BOLD font have been capped by their senior international XV side as nationality shown.

Players in Italic font have capped either by their international 7s side; or by the international XV 'A' side as nationality shown.

Players in normal font have not been capped at senior level.

A position in parentheses indicates that the player debuted as a substitute. A player may have made a prior debut for Glasgow Warriors in a non-competitive match, 'A' match or 7s match; these matches are not listed.

Tournaments where competitive debut made:

Crosshatching indicates a jointly hosted match.

Sponsorship

Official Kit Supplier

Canterbury - Official Kit Supplier

References

2009-10
2009–10 in Scottish rugby union
2009–10 Celtic League by team
2009–10 Heineken Cup by team